The Transactions and Proceedings of the Royal Society of New Zealand was a scientific journal and magazine published by the Royal Society of New Zealand. Before 1933 the society was called the New Zealand Institute, and the journal's name was Transactions and Proceedings of the New Zealand Institute. It was active between 1868 and 1961 and was the most important scientific journal in New Zealand.

Notable contributors 
Thomas Cheeseman, naturalist
William Colenso, botanist
Harold John Finlay, palaeontologist and conchologist.
Charles Fleming, ornithologist and palaeontologist
James Hector, geologist
Thomas Hocken, botanist and anthropologist
Ernest Rutherford, chemist and physicist, Nobel laureate

References

External links 

English-language journals
Publications established in 1868
Publications disestablished in 1969
Multidisciplinary scientific journals
Defunct journals
Academic journals published by learned and professional societies
Royal Society of New Zealand